Surčin railway station is a railway station of Belgrade railway junction. Located in Surčin, Belgrade, Serbia. Railroad continued to Batajnica in one, and Ostružnica in the other direction. Surčin railway station consists of 5 railway track.

See also 
 Serbian Railways

References 

Railway stations in Belgrade
Surčin